Acanthocotyle is a genus of monogenean fish skin parasites.

References 

Gyrodactylidea
Monogenea genera